The Vanderbrande Baronetcy, of Cleverskirke, was a title in the Baronetage of England. It was created on 9 June 1699 for John Peter Vanderbrande.  The title is presumed to have become extinct on the death of the second Baronet some time after 1713.

Vanderbrande baronets, of Cleverskirke (1699)
Sir John Peter Vanderbrande, 1st Baronet (died )
Sir Cornelius Vanderbrande, 2nd Baronet (died after 1713)

References

Extinct baronetcies in the Baronetage of England